The 1975–76 Roller Hockey Champions Cup was the 11th edition of the Roller Hockey Champions Cup organized by CERH.

Voltregà achieved their third title.

Teams
The champions of the main European leagues, and Voltregà as title holders, played this competition, consisting in a double-legged knockout tournament. As Voltregà qualified also as Spanish champion, Barcelona joined also the competition.

Bracket

Source:

References

External links
 CERH website

1975 in roller hockey
1976 in roller hockey
Rink Hockey Euroleague